Pokladov is a rural locality (a khutor) in Alexeyevsky District, Belgorod Oblast, Russia. The population was 83 as of 2010. There is 1 street.

Geography 
Pokladov is located 18 km south of Alexeyevka (the district's administrative centre) by road. Garbuzovo is the nearest rural locality.

References 

Rural localities in Alexeyevsky District, Belgorod Oblast
Biryuchensky Uyezd